The 1990 Memphis State Tigers football team represented Memphis State University (now known as the University of Memphis) in the 1990 NCAA Division I-A football season. The team was led by head coach Chuck Stobart.  The Tigers played their home games at the Liberty Bowl Memorial Stadium.

Schedule

References

Memphis
Memphis Tigers football seasons
Memphis Tigers football